Bannan is a surname and may refer to: 

Barry Bannan (born 1989), Scottish international footballer (Aston Villa, Crystal Palace)
Justin Bannan (born 1979), American football defensive tackle
Sarah Bannan, author of Weightless
Tommy Bannan (1930–2004), Scottish footballer
Bannan Line, Blue Line of Taipei Metro.

Television
Bannan (TV series) is a Scottish Gaelic television series

See also
Bannen (disambiguation)
Bannon, a surname